Sericosema juturnaria, the bordered fawn, is a species of geometrid moth in the family Geometridae. It is found in North America.

The MONA or Hodges number for Sericosema juturnaria is 6672.

References

Further reading

 

Caberini
Articles created by Qbugbot
Moths described in 1858